Claudio Ledesma (born April 2, 1983) is an American mixed martial artist currently competing as a Flyweight. A professional competitor since 2009, Ledesma has previously competed for Bellator.

Mixed martial arts career

Early career
Making his professional debut in 2009, Ledesma compiled a record of 4 wins and 2 losses before signing with Bellator.

Bellator Fighting Championships
Ledesma made his Bellator debut on October 15, 2011 against Brian Kelleher at Bellator 54. Ledesma won the fight via unanimous decision.

In his next bout for Bellator, Ledesma faced future Bellator bantamweight title challenger Anthony Leone at Bellator 68 on May 11, 2012. Ledesma lost the fight via split decision.

Ledesma faced Kenny Foster on September 28, 2012 at Bellator 74. He won the fight via unanimous decision.

Ledesma was expected to face Nick Kirk at Bellator 83 on December 7, 2012. However, the fight was cancelled prior to the event. Ledesma instead faced David Harris and won via unanimous decision.

Cage Fury Fighting Championships
After his Bellator stint, Ledesma faced former Bellator bantamweight champion Zach Makovsky at CFFC 24: Sullivan vs. Becker. Ledemsa was defeated via unanimous decision.

Ledesma then faced Marcio Bittencourt at CFFC 34: Santella vs. Honstein on April 19, 2014. Ledesma won the fight via TKO in the third round.

Ledesma faced Darren Mima at CFFC 36: Secor vs. Good on June 21, 2014. He lost via unanimous decision. 

Ledesma faced Dave Morgan on December 13, 2014 at CFFC 44: Bezerra vs. Makashvili 2. He won the fight via rear-naked choke submission in the first round.

Ledesma faced Evan Velez at CFFC 48: Good vs. Burrell on May 9, 2015. He won the fight via unanimous decision.

Ledesma faced UFC veteran Louis Gaudinot in the main event of CFFC 51 on September 12, 2015. He lost the fight by unanimous decision.

Mixed martial arts record

|-
|Loss
|align=center|16–10
|Wascar Cruz
|TKO (punches)
|Combate Global: Acosta vs. Coates
|
|align=center|2
|align=center|4:24
|Miami, Florida, United States
|
|-
|Loss
|align=center|16–9
|Tony Laramie
|Decision (unanimous)
|Prospect Fighting Championships 13
|
|align=center|5
|align=center|5:00
|Toronto, Canada
|
|-
|Loss
|align=center|16–8
|Juan Puerta
|Decision (unanimous)
|Titan FC 55: Puerta vs. Ledesma 
|
|align=center|3
|align=center|5:00
|Fort Lauderdale, Florida, United States
|
|-
|Win
|align=center|16–7
|Jesse Bazzi
|Decision (unanimous)
|PA Cage Fight 35 
|
|align=center|3
|align=center|5:00
|Wilkes-Barre, Pennsylvania, United States
|
|-
|Win
|align=center|15–7
|Andre Bernardo
|Decision (unanimous)
|MMA Pro League 1: New Jersey vs. Pennsylvania 
|
|align=center|3
|align=center|5:00
|Atlantic City, New Jersey, United States
|
|-
|Win
|align=center|14–7
|Desmond Moore
|Decision (unanimous)
|CFFC 68 
|
|align=center|3
|align=center|5:00
|Atlantic City, New Jersey, United States
|
|-
|Win
|align=center|13–7
|Alberto Orellano
|Decision (unanimous)
|CFFC 63: Anyanwu vs. Teed
|
|align=center|3
|align=center|5:00
|Atlantic City, New Jersey, United States
|
|-
|Win
|align=center|12–7
|Tuan Pham
|Decision (split)
|CFFC 61: Anyanwu vs. Pinto
|
|align=center|3
|align=center|5:00
|Atlantic City, New Jersey, United States
|
|-
|Loss
|align=center|11–7
|Jordan Morales 
|Decision (split)
|CFFC 55: Chookagian vs. Varela
|
|align=center|3
|align=center|5:00
|Bethlehem, Pennsylvania, United States
|
|-
|Loss
|align=center|11–6
|Louis Gaudinot
|Decision (unanimous)
|CFFC 51: Ledesma vs. Gaudinot
|
|align=center|3
|align=center|5:00
|Bethlehem, Pennsylvania, United States
|
|-
|Win
|align=center|11–5
|Evan Velez
|Decision (unanimous)
|CFFC 48: Good vs. Burrell
|
|align=center|3
|align=center|5:00
|Atlantic City, New Jersey, United States
|
|-
|Win
|align=center|10–5
|Dave Morgan
|Submission (rear-naked choke)
|CFFC 44: Bezerra vs. Makashvili 2
|
|align=center|1
|align=center|2:49
|Bethlehem, Pennsylvania, United States
|
|-
|Loss
|align=center|9–5
|Darren Mima
|Decision (unanimous)
|CFFC 36: Secor vs. Good
|
|align=center|3
|align=center|5:00
|Morristown, New Jersey, United States
|
|-
|Win
|align=center|9–4
|Marcio Bittencourt
|TKO (punches)
|CFFC 34: Santella vs. Honstein
|
|align=center|3
|align=center|1:10
|Morristown, New Jersey, United States
|
|-
|Loss
|align=center|8–4
|Zach Makovsky
|Decision (unanimous)
|CFFC 24: Sullivan vs. Becker
|
|align=center|3
|align=center|5:00
|Atlantic City, New Jersey, United States
|
|-
|Win
|align=center|8–3
|David Harris
|Decision (unanimous)
|Bellator 83
|
|align=center|3
|align=center|5:00
|Atlantic City, New Jersey, United States
|
|-
|Win
|align=center|7–3
|Kenny Foster
|Decision (unanimous)
|Bellator 74
|
|align=center|3
|align=center|5:00
|Atlantic City, New Jersey, United States
|
|-
|Loss
|align=center|6–3
|Anthony Leone
|Decision (split)
|Bellator 68
|
|align=center|3
|align=center|5:00
|Atlantic City, New Jersey, United States
|
|-
|Win
|align=center|6–2
|Pedro Gonzalez
|Decision (unanimous)
|CFFC 13: Gambino vs. Foster
|
|align=center|3
|align=center|5:00
|Atlantic City, New Jersey, United States
|
|-
|Win
|align=center|5–2
|Brian Kelleher
|Decision (unanimous)
|Bellator 54
|
|align=center|3
|align=center|5:00
|Atlantic City, New Jersey, United States
|
|-
|Loss
|align=center|4–2
|Aljamain Sterling
|Decision (split)
|Ring of Combat 36
|
|align=center|3
|align=center|5:00
|Atlantic City, New Jersey, United States
|
|-
|Win
|align=center|4–1
|Michael LaDuke
|Submission (rear-naked choke)
|Ring of Combat 35
|
|align=center|2
|align=center|0:43
|Atlantic City, New Jersey, United States
|
|-
|Win
|align=center|3–1
|Michael Murray
|Decision (unanimous)
|Ring of Combat 32
|
|align=center|3
|align=center|4:00
|Atlantic City, New Jersey, United States
|
|-
|Win
|align=center|2–1
|Adam Shortz
|TKO (punches)
|UCC 3: Renegades
|
|align=center|1
|align=center|4:08
|Jersey City, New Jersey, United States
|
|-
|Loss
|align=center|1–1
|Jimmie Rivera
|Decision (unanimous)
|UCC 1: Merciless
|
|align=center|3
|align=center|5:00
|Jersey City, New Jersey, United States
|
|-
|Win
|align=center|1–0
|Larry Byrnes
|Submission (rear-naked choke)
|Asylum Fight League 21
|
|align=center|2
|align=center|1:51
|Philadelphia, Pennsylvania, United States
|

References

Living people
1983 births
American male mixed martial artists
Flyweight mixed martial artists